Black and White Magic is a 1983 Soviet comedy film directed by Naum Birman.

Plot 
The film tells about two guys who are all tired of their tricks. Everything changes when a new girl appears in the classroom and suggested not to take the guys on a campaign until they become more serious. And they began to look for something to do.

Cast 
 Pavel Plisov
 Anton Granat
 Margarita Ivanova
 Alexander Lenkov
 Marianna Kazyonnaya
 Denis Levin		
 Aleksandr Sukhanov
 Natalya Popova
 Andrei Puzanov
 Nikolay Volkov

References

External links 
 

1983 films
1980s Russian-language films
Soviet comedy films
1983 comedy films